Albin Carlson (born March 15, 1994) is a Swedish professional ice hockey defenceman. He is currently playing for Södertälje SK of the HockeyAllsvenskan (Allsv). 

He has formerly played in the SHL with Modo Hockey. On April 6, 2016, Karlsson signed a two-year contract with Almtuna IS of the Allsvenskan. Following the completion of his contract with Almtuna, Karlsson then played four seasons with Timrå IK.

References

External links

1994 births
Living people
Almtuna IS players
IF Björklöven players
Modo Hockey players
Swedish ice hockey defencemen
Timrå IK players